Paul Ruiz (born June 23, 1987) is an American mixed martial artist who last competed in the Bantamweight division of Bellator MMA. A professional competitor since 2010 to 2016, he also competed for Strikeforce and Tachi Palace Fights.

Mixed martial arts record

|-
| Win
| align=center| 7-3
| Christian Buron-Navarro
| Decision (split)
| Bellator 156
| 
| align=center| 3
| align=center| 5:00
| Fresno, California, United States
|Catchweight (140 lbs) bout.
|-
| Loss
| align=center| 6-3
| Josh San Diego
| Decision (unanimous)
| Bellator 148
| 
| align=center| 3
| align=center| 5:00
| Fresno, California, United States
| 
|-
| Win
| align=center| 6-2
| Nick Sperling
| Submission (rear-naked choke)
| Bellator 133
| 
| align=center| 1
| align=center| 0:43
| Fresno, California, United States
| 
|-
| Loss
| align=center| 5-2
| Joe Neal
| Decision (unanimous)
| Bellator 125
| 
| align=center| 3
| align=center| 5:00
| Fresno, California, United States
| 
|-
| Win
| align=center| 5-1
| Ed Tomaselli
| TKO (punches)
| TWC 19: Blackout
| 
| align=center| 1
| align=center| 1:14
| Porterville, California, United States
| 
|-
| Win
| align=center| 4-1
| Steven Urias
| Decision (unanimous)
| UPC Unlimited: Up & Comers 12: Turning Point
| 
| align=center| 3
| align=center| 3:00
| Coarsegold, California, United States
| 
|-
| Win
| align=center| 3-1
| Ruben Trujillo
| TKO (punches)
| TPF 13: Unfinished Business
| 
| align=center| 1
| align=center| 1:13
| Lemoore, California, United States
|Return to Bantamweight.
|-
| Loss
| align=center| 2-1
| Anthony Figueroa
| Decision (unanimous)
| TPF 11: Redemption
| 
| align=center| 3
| align=center| 5:00
| Lemoore, California, United States
|Flyweight debut.
|-
| Win
| align=center| 2-0
| Caleb Vallotton
| Decision (unanimous)
| UPC Unlimited: Up & Comers 4
| 
| align=center| 3
| align=center| 5:00
| Madera, California, United States
| 
|-
| Win
| align=center| 1-0
| Jesus Castro
| TKO (punches)
| Bellator XXXV
| 
| align=center| 1
| align=center| 1:17
| Lemoore, California, United States
|

Mixed martial arts amateur record

|-
| Win
| align=center| 2-0
| Gregg Baker
| Submission (Armbar)
| Strikeforce Challengers: Bowling vs. Voelker
| 
| align=center| 1
| align=center| 1:23
| Fresno, California, United States
| 
|-
| Win
| align=center| 1-0
| John Chacon
| Decision (Unanimous)
| Strikeforce Challengers: Johnson vs. Mahe
| 
| align=center| 3
| align=center| 2:00
| Fresno, California, United States
|

See also
List of male mixed martial artists

References

1987 births
American male mixed martial artists
Bantamweight mixed martial artists
Living people
People from Fresno County, California